The Tyrageti, Tyragetae, or Tyrangitae (Strabo vii.; Ptol. iii. 5. § 25), literally, the Getae of the Tyras, were a sub-tribe of the Getae, situated on the river Tyras (modern-day Dniester in Moldova and Ukraine). They were regarded as an immigrant tribe of European Sarmatia dwelling E. of the river Tyras, near the Carpii and Tagri, and, according to Ptolemy, the northern neighbours of Lower Moesia. Pliny (v. 12. s. 26) calls them, with more correct orthography, Tyragetae, and represents them as dwelling on a large island in the Tyras.

References

External links 

Ancient tribes in Romania
Getic tribes